Paneriai railway station is a Lithuanian Railways station in Vilnius. It is mostly used for industry and cargo handling.

Part of its cargo transactions was moved to the new Vaidotai railway station.

Since 2013 a train with Peugeot productions has regularly gone from Paneriai railway station to Kazakhstan.

References 

Railway stations in Vilnius
Paneriai